Napa is the largest city and county seat of Napa County and a principal city of Wine Country in Northern California. Located in the North Bay region of the Bay Area, the city had a population of 77,480 as of the end of 2021. Napa is a major tourist destination in California, known for its wineries, restaurants, and arts culture.

History 

The origin of the word "Napa" is disputed. 

The word napa is of Native American derivation and has been variously translated as “grizzly bear,” “house,” “motherland” or “fish.” Of the many explanations of the names’s origin, the most plausible seems to be that it is derived from the Patwin word napo meaning house. 

Further adding confusion, Napa was originally spelled with two P’s: Nappa. There are maps and deeds dating back to the mid-1850's bearing this spelling. Shortly thereafter the spelling changed to "Napa" as it's known today; there reasons for this are unclear.

Mexican era
At the time of the first recorded exploration into Napa Valley in 1823, the majority of the inhabitants consisted of Native American Indians. Padre José Altimira, founder of Mission San Francisco Solano in Sonoma, led the expedition. Spanish priests converted some natives; the rest were attacked and dispersed by Mexican soldiers.

The first now American immigrants began arriving in area in the 1830s.

Post-Conquest era

Prior to the American Conquest of California, Napa Valley was in California's District of Sonoma. At the time, its boundaries also included Lake County to the north. By this time, the indigenous people were either working as field laborers or living in small bands in the hills surrounding the valley. Tensions between the white settlers and Native Americans broke into war in 1850, resulting in soldiers hunting down and killing all the natives they could find, driving the remainder north toward Clear Lake. By 1870, the Native American population consisted of only a few laborers and servants working for the white settlers.

The City of Napa was founded by Nathan Coombs in 1847. General Mariano Guadalupe Vallejo had paid to survey for a township downriver at Soscol Landing where riverboats could turn around prior to Napa's founding. Instead, the Napa town site was surveyed on property Coombs had received from Nicolas Higuera, original holder of the Rancho Entre Napa, a Mexican land grant. The first record of a ship navigating the river was the Susana in 1842, though by 1850 the Dolphin became the first passenger steamship to navigate the Napa River in order to open another path of commerce.

In the mid-1850s, Napa's Main Street rivaled that of many larger cities, with as many as 100 saddle horses tied to the fences on an average afternoon. John Patchett opened the first commercial winery in the county in 1859. The Napa Valley Register, founded by J.I. Horrell and L. Hoxie Strong, made its debut on August 10, 1863, with weekly publications until becoming a daily newspaper in 1872.

The California Gold Rush of the late 1850s expanded Napa City. A tent city was erected along Main Street. Many cattle ranches were maintained, and the lumber industry had greatly expanded. Sawmills in the valley were in operation cutting up timber that was hauled by team to Napa, and then shipped out on the river to Benicia and San Francisco.

In 1858 the great silver rush began in Napa Valley, and miners eagerly flocked to the eastern hills. In the 1860s, mining carried on, in a large scale, with quicksilver mines operating in many areas of Napa County. The most noted mine was the Silverado Mine, near the summit of Mount Saint Helena. At this time, the first wave of rural, foreign laborers from coastal villages of China's Canton province arrived in California, and at Napa County mines. A settlement for Chinese laborers in Napa was established in the early 1860s. At its peak from the 1880s to the early 1900s the Chinese population grew to a population of over 300 people.

In 1869, F. A. Sawyer established Sawyer Tanning Company in Napa and was joined in the business by his father B. F. Sawyer a year later. It went on to become the largest tannery west of the Mississippi River. The world-famous Nappa leather or Napa leather was invented by Emanuel Manasse in Napa in 1875 while working at the Sawyer Tanning Company.

Napa was incorporated on March 23, 1872, and reincorporated in 1874 as the City of Napa.

The Napa State Hospital received its first patients in 1876. The Napa Valley Opera House became popular after its debut on February 13, 1880, with a production of Gilbert and Sullivan's HMS Pinafore but, it later languished and was closed for many years. It was reestablished in the 1980s.

Modern era

Napa had become the primary business and economic center for the Napa Valley by the dawn of the 20th century. The San Francisco, Napa and Calistoga Railway was established in 1905 for passenger and freight service. The railroad carried passengers from ferry boats in Vallejo to stops in Napa and other locations in the valley.

As agricultural and wine interests developed north of the city limits, much of the light industry, banking, commercial and retail activity in the county evolved within the city of Napa and in earlier times along the Napa River through the historic downtown. Napa Glove Factory was established in 1903 and was the largest plant of its kind west of Chicago. 

Edwin Pridham and Peter L. Jensen invented the moving-coil loudspeaker in 1915 in their Napa workshop while working on an improvement for the telephone receiver. Pridham and Jensen went on to found the Magnavox Company in 1917. In the late 19th century and early 20th century Napa was known for having a sizable red-light district, with brothels primarily concentrated on and around Clinton Street.

Following studies made by the U.S. Department of the Interior in 1930-40s, the U.S. Congress authorized channel improvements on Napa River and construction of a dam on Conn Creek as part of the Flood Control Act of 1944, though funding was never approved. The City of Napa funded and built the dam in order to create the water conservation reservoir Lake Hennessey in 1948, however flooding continued to be a problem. 

The 1986 Napa River flood revived public interest in finding a remedy. After a plan to widen the river channel proposed by the Army Corps of Engineers was presented in 1995 and roundly rejected, a group of special interests called Friends of the River formed, which built consensus on a "living river" plan. Voters in the County of Napa narrowly approved an increase of sales tax in a March 1998 election to fund the Napa River Flood Project. In 2005, the Napa River again flooded the entire downtown area and destroyed 1,000 homes across the county.

An ambitious redevelopment plan encompassing several blocks of downtown Napa's retail property was undertaken by the city in the early 1970s, though it did little to improve the city's economy. Downtown Napa finally began to recover and emerge from a long economic slumber in the 2000s, triggered by a significant growth in Main Street restaurants and hotels. The redevelopment of First and Main streets and the Napa Mill complex helped to stimulate investments along the Napa riverfront.

In October 2017 the Atlas Fire and Partrick Fires burned several parts of Napa County. See also October 2017 Northern California wildfires

Geography
Napa was the first location in California to be part of the North Coast American Viticultural Area. Renowned for its wine due to the Mediterranean climate, surprisingly only about 9% of Napa's acres are planted to grapes.

The Napa River traverses the city on its journey to the San Pablo Bay. The city has conducted a variety of waterfront development along the banks of the river, including certain fill operations governed by the United States Army Corps of Engineers regulations.

Climate
Napa has a Mediterranean climate similar to many other parts of Northern California. Winters are chilly and wet, and summers are warm and dry. During the summer months rain is rare. Occasionally there may be a day or two of light rain in June and September. Heat waves do occur with the temperatures rising above 100 °F. Wildfires are typically a problem during the summer months. The fall is pleasant and many people come to visit Napa at this time. The winters are quite wet and cool and flooding can be a major problem. Nighttime temperatures often drop below freezing. The rainy season is from October to April and occasionally into May. Snow is rare.

Demographics

2010

The 2010 United States Census reported that Napa had a population of 76,915. The racial makeup of Napa was 57,754 (75.1%) White, 486 (0.6%) African American, 637 (0.8%) Native American, 1,755 (2.3%) Asian, 144 (0.2%) Pacific Islander, 13,256 (17.2%) from other races, and 2,883 (3.7%) from two or more races. Hispanic or Latino of any race were 28,923 persons (37.6%).

The Census reported that 75,678 people (98.4% of the population) lived in households, 568 (0.7%) lived in non-institutionalized group quarters, and 669 (0.9%) were institutionalized.

There were 28,166 households, out of which 9,826 (34.9%) had children under the age of 18 living in them, 13,862 (49.2%) were opposite-sex married couples living together, 3,201 (11.4%) had a female householder with no husband present, 1,571 (5.6%) had a male householder with no wife present. There were 1,694 (6.0%) unmarried opposite-sex partnerships, and 221 (0.8%) same-sex married couples or partnerships. 7,457 households (26.5%) were made up of individuals, and 3,278 (11.6%) had someone living alone who was 65 years of age or older. The average household size was 2.69. There were 18,634 families (66.2% of all households); the average family size was 3.25.

The population was spread out, with 18,848 people (24.5%) under the age of 18, 6,724 people (8.7%) aged 18 to 24, 20,933 people (27.2%) aged 25 to 44, 19,919 people (25.9%) aged 45 to 64, and 10,491 people (13.6%) who were 65 years of age or older. The median age was 37.4 years. For every 100 females, there were 97.4 males. For every 100 females age 18 and over, there were 94.8 males.

The homeowner vacancy rate was 2.3%; the rental vacancy rate was 5.7%. 41,591 people (54.1% of the population) lived in owner-occupied housing units and 34,087 people (44.3%) lived in rental housing units.

Economy

Napa's economy is characterized by its position as one of the principal cities of Wine Country, resulting in a significant portion of jobs in the city relating to wineries, restaurants, hotels, and other hospitality industries.

The Napa State Hospital is located in Imola, an unincorporated area bordering the city of Napa.

The Napa Valley Business Park is located adjacent to the Napa County Airport in an unincorporated area of Napa County. Employers in the area include The Doctors Company and Treasury Wine Estates.

Top employers

The town's comprehensive annual financial report for the fiscal year that ended June 30, 2020, lists the top ten employers in the City of Napa as the following:

Government

Transportation

CA-29 runs through Napa, connecting to Vallejo and the East Bay Area to the south and the Napa Wine Country to the north. CA-12 runs to the south of the city, connecting to Fairfield and Interstate 80 to the east and Sonoma and US-101 to the west.

Napa County Airport to the south, also serves as a small public airport.

Valley Intercity Neighborhood Express, more commonly known by the acronym "VINE Transit", is the public transportation service for Napa as well as for Napa County. It is managed under the Napa County Transportation and Planning Agency and is operated by Veolia Transportation. In addition to providing service to Napa, the VINE has extensive service throughout the county and has connections to other public transportation systems in the nearby counties.

Evans Transportation provides daily service to and from Oakland International Airport and San Francisco International Airport daily from Napa at their main office on CA-29.

Notable people

 Larry Allen, former NFL player
 Alisa Bellettini, television producer, creator of House of Style
 Jerry Bohlander, mixed martial arts fighter
 Phil Bonifield, NASCAR driver
 John Boyett, former NFL player
 Warren Brusstar, MLB player
 Bill Buckner, MLB player
 Cristina García, novelist
 Mike Gibson, NFL player for the Arizona Cardinals
 Steve Hendrickson,  former NFL player
 Adam Housley, Fox News correspondent
 Josh Jackson, NBA player
 Joe Kmak, MLB player for the Milwaukee Brewers and Chicago Cubs
 Jim Landis, MLB player
 Ray Manzarek, The Doors keyboard player
 Scott McCarron, Professional Golfer
 Peter Menzel, photographer
 Johnny Miller, golfer
 Olivia O'Brien, musician 
 Donny Robinson, Olympic BMX bronze medalist
 Andrew Talansky, Professional Cyclist for Cannondale-Garmin
 Shirley Walker, film score composer
 Charles Woodson, former NFL player and Heisman Trophy winner.

Sister cities

Napa's sister cities are:
 Casablanca, Chile
 Iwanuma, Japan
 Launceston, Australia

See also

 List of cities and towns in California
 List of cities and towns in the San Francisco Bay Area
 Napa Valley AVA
 Napa Valley Register
 Wine Country

References

External links

 
 

 
1872 establishments in California
Cities in Napa County, California
Cities in the San Francisco Bay Area
County seats in California
Incorporated cities and towns in California
Napa Valley
Populated places established in 1872